Oneself is a reflexive pronoun. It may also refer to:

Self, an individual person as the object of his or her own reflective consciousness
Philosophy of self, which defines the essential qualities that make one person distinct from all others
Self-concept, a multi-dimensional construct that refers to an individual's perception of "self" in relation to any number of characteristics
Identity (social science), the conception and expression of a person's individuality or group affiliations
Personal identity 
Oneself (rapper), an American hip hop artist based in Milwaukee, Wisconsin